The Monk and the Woman is a 1917 Australian silent film directed by Franklyn Barrett. It is considered to be lost.

Plot
In eighteenth century France, the evil Prince de Montrale (Harry Plimmer) falls in love with Liane (Maud Fane), but she runs away from him and seeks refuge in a monastery. The prince finds her and orders the abbot to keep her in custody. A young novice, Brother Paul (Percy Marmont), is placed in charge of Liane and falls in love with her, despite having just taken his vows of celibacy.

The king (Monte Luke) commands that Liane marry the Prince. A wedding is prepared but Paul defeats the prince in a duel, steals his cloak and takes his place at the wedding. The impersonation is discovered and Paul is taken away to be executed. De Montrale leads a revolt against the king but Paul keeps fight off the attack until loyalists arrive. Paul then returns to the monastery forever.

Cast
Maud Fane as Countess Liane
Percy Marmont as Brother Paul
Harry Plimmer as Prince de Montrale
Monte Luke as the king
Alma Rock Phillips as de Vernet
Ruth Wainwright as Mme de Vigne, the king's favourite
Hugh Huntley as Armande
Charles Beetham
George Young
Mattie Ive as page boy

Original play
The play was first produced in England in 1912 where it ran for a year. Theatre entrepreneur George Marlow bought the Australian rights and presented it in 1912. It was controversial and received protests from church groups, being condemned by the Australian Catholic Federation.

The film version changed the ending so that Brother Paul renounced his loved one and returned to the monastery, whereas in the play the two lovers stayed together.

Production
The film adaptation was likely made in response to the 1917 film The Church and the Woman. Shooting began in August 1917 and took place on the stage of the Theatre Royal in Sydney, and on location in French's Forest, Sydney, with some additional scenes shot at W.D. Dailey's castle in Manly.

Percy Marmont, Hugh Huntley and Maud Fane were all British stage stars then touring Australia; this was Marmont's film debut. It was produced by noted stage actor George Marlow.

Release
Despite changing the ending, the film was still seen as controversial by the Catholic Federation, who objected to its depiction of Catholicism. However, it was still passed by the censor. Advertisements heavily played up the controversy and the movie was a major success at the box office. It was still screening in cinemas in 1922.

Critical
In the words of the Sunday Times "costume plays are notoriously at once difficult and expensive of production, and the utmost care must be exercised in order to escape anachronism. In this direction the pitfalls seem to have been avoided in the skilled hands o£ Mr W. Franklyn Barrett, who adapted the play to photography and produced; of Mr. D. H. Souter, who is responsible for the artistic titles; and of Mr. Rock Phillips, who undertook the art production."

Legal Issues
George Marlow sued the makers of The Church and the Woman (1917) and got a court injunction forcing the producers of the latter to advertise their film specifically saying it was different from The Monk and the Woman. This was done.

See also
List of lost films

References

External links

The Monk and the Woman at National Film and Sound Archive
The Monk and the Woman at SilentEra

1917 films
Australian drama films
Australian silent feature films
Australian black-and-white films
Australian films based on plays
Lost Australian films
1917 drama films
1917 lost films
Lost drama films
Films directed by Franklyn Barrett
Silent drama films